Diaphus meadi, Mead's lanternfish, is a species of lanternfish 
found pretty much worldwide.

Size

Etymology
The fish is named in honor of ichthyologist Giles W. Mead (1928–2003), who as cruise leader on the Anton Bruun cruises, six to the Indian Ocean and thirteen to the Eastern South Pacific, was largely responsible for much of the material reported on by the author.

References

Myctophidae
Taxa named by Basil Nafpaktitis
Fish described in 1978